This is a list of the national roads in South Sudan. The list is not exhaustive.

National roads

See also
 Economy of South Sudan
 Transport in South Sudan

References

Roads in South Sudan
South Sudan
Roads
Roads